Mangart or Mangrt is a mountain in the Julian Alps, located on the border between Italy and Slovenia. It was first climbed in 1794 by the naturalist Franz von Hohenwart. Mangart is also the name of the mountain range between the Koritnica Valley and the Mangart Valley, with the highest peak called Veliki Mangart (Big Mount Mangart).

Name
Mount Mangart was attested in historical sources in 1617 as Monhart. The name is of German origin, derived from the personal name Mainhart (from Old High German Maganhard). In addition to serving as the name of the mountain, this German name has also developed into Slovene surnames such as Manhart and Menart.

Access
The road to Mangart Saddle is the highest road in Slovenia. The Mangart Pass Lodge is located at the western foot of Mangart. There are  under Mangart's northern face.

References

External links 

 Map on Geopedia
 Mangart na Hribi.net

Mountains of the Julian Alps
Mountains of Friuli-Venezia Giulia
Italy–Slovenia border
Province of Udine
Two-thousanders of Italy
Two-thousanders of Slovenia